Harold G. Dembo (December 24, 1915 – May 24, 2006) was an American professional basketball player. He played in the National Basketball League for the Chicago Bruins in two games during the 1939–40 season.

References

1915 births
2006 deaths
Amateur Athletic Union men's basketball players
American men's basketball players
Basketball players from Chicago
Chicago Bruins players
Forwards (basketball)
Illinois Wesleyan Titans men's basketball players